Camille Wright Thompson (born March 5, 1955) is an American former competition swimmer and Olympic medalist.

Wright won three gold medals at the 1975 Pan American Games in Mexico City, including the 100-meter and 200-meter butterfly events, and as a member of the winning U.S. team in the 4×100-meter medley relay.  At the 1975 World Aquatics Championships in Cali, Colombia, she received a silver medal as a member of the second-place U.S. team in the 4×100-meter medley relay, and a bronze in the 100-meter butterfly.

Wright represented the United States at the 1976 Summer Olympics in Montreal, Quebec.  She received a silver medal as a member of the second-place U.S. team in the women's 4×100-meter medley relay, together with teammates Linda Jezek (backstroke), Lauri Siering (breaststroke), and Shirley Babashoff (freestyle).

Individually, Wright also competed in the 100- and 200-meter butterfly events at the 1976 Olympics.  She finished fourth overall in the women's 100-meter butterfly with a time of 1:01.41.  In the 200-meter butterfly, she recorded the tenth best overall time of 2:14.77, but did not advance to the event final.

See also
 List of Olympic medalists in swimming (women)
 List of University of Hawaii alumni
 List of World Aquatics Championships medalists in swimming (women)

References

1955 births
Living people
American female butterfly swimmers
Hawaii Rainbow Wahine swimmers
Olympic silver medalists for the United States in swimming
Pan American Games gold medalists for the United States
People from New Albany, Indiana
Swimmers at the 1975 Pan American Games
Swimmers at the 1976 Summer Olympics
World Aquatics Championships medalists in swimming
Medalists at the 1976 Summer Olympics
Pan American Games medalists in swimming
Medalists at the 1975 Pan American Games